São Tomé and Príncipe is divided into seven administrative districts since 1980. Six are located on the main island of São Tomé while one (Pagué) covers the smaller island of Príncipe. Since 1995, the Pagué District has been replaced by the Autonomous Region of Príncipe.

See also
 List of cities and towns in São Tomé and Príncipe

References

 
Subdivisions of São Tomé and Príncipe
Sao Tome and Principe, Districts
Sao Tome and Principe 2
Districts, Sao Tome and Principe
São Tomé and Príncipe geography-related lists